San Pedro y San Pablo Ayutla is a town and municipality in Oaxaca in south-western Mexico. 
It is part of the Sierra Mixe district within the Sierra Norte de Oaxaca Region.

The climate is temperate to cool, with warmer micro-regions in the lowlands and ravines. The rainy season begins in May and ends in October with drizzle in the rest of the year. Forest cover is pine-oak.

As of 2005, the municipality had 1,014 households with a total population of 4.319 of whom 3,639 spoke an indigenous language.
The main economic activity is logging.

References

Municipalities of Oaxaca